Sad Café may refer to:

 Sad Café, a band featuring Paul Young
Sad Café (album) by Sad Café
 "The Sad Café", a song by The Eagles, featured on their 1979 album The Long Run

See also
 The Ballad of the Sad Café, a 1951 collection of short stories by Carson McCullers, which includes a novella, also called The Ballad of the Sad Cafe
 The Ballad of the Sad Café, a 1963 play by Edward Albee based on the novella by Carson McCullers
 The Ballad of the Sad Café (film), a 1991 film directed by Simon Callow, based on the play by Edward Albee